The second season of Beauty & the Beast, an American television series developed by Sherri Cooper-Landsman and Jennifer Levin and very loosely inspired by the 1987 CBS television series of the same name, commenced airing in the United States on October 7, 2013, concluded July 7, 2014, and consisted of 22 episodes.

Beauty & the Beast'''s second season aired in the United States (U.S.) on Mondays at 9:00 pm ET on The CW, a terrestrial television network, where it received an average of 1.24 million viewers per episode.

Premise
Catherine Chandler, a law student, witnesses her mother being shot the same night she is saved from her mother's murderers by a supposed beast. Nine years later, and now working as a detective for the NYPD, a case leads her to discover that Vincent Keller, an ex-soldier believed to have been killed in action during military service, is actually alive. As Catherine gets to know him, she starts finding out more about her mother's murder and about who (and what) Vincent really is. At the same time, they get to know one another and eventually fall in love.

Plot
Vincent was captured by Muirfield, an underground government organization that has been hunting him, in the previous season finale. Cat, the woman who he has fallen in love with and who accepts what he has been changed into by Muirfield, will do anything to find him. This season, their love faces more challenges than ever before.

During the season, Vincent and Cat briefly break up with each other, due to Vincent having changed so much because of Muirfield wiping his memory. Cat starts a relationship with Gabe, a previous beast, now turned ally, while Vincent starts to date Tori, a wealthy socialite who has discovered that she is also a Beast. Eventually, after regaining his memories and Tori's death during the season, Vincent realizes that he is still in love with Cat and tries to win her back, but she rejects his advances. However, slowly she starts to realize that she still loves him and they both get back together near the end of the season.

However, Gabe does not take the break up very well and starts to become obsessed with hunting down Vincent, by framing him for murder. He tries to hide his jealousy by claiming Vincent is dangerous, and he is only trying to protect Cat, while at the same time trying to win her back. However, he becomes more dangerous, as he suspends both Cat and Tess from the police force, becomes more ruthless and even goes so far as to kidnapping Cat's sister Heather, who then later learns Vincent's secret. However things become much worse after Gabe becomes a Beast again and starts killing those closest to Cat and Vincent. A final showdown will come between them finally ending the feud once and for all which could possibly end Vincent's life.

Cast

Main
Kristin Kreuk as Catherine "Cat" Chandler
Jay Ryan as Vincent Keller
Austin Basis as J.T. Forbes
Nina Lisandrello as Tess Vargas
Sendhil Ramamurthy as Gabriel 'Gabe' Lowen
Amber Skye Noyes as Tori Windsor

Recurring
Ted Whittall as Bob Reynolds
Tom Everett Scott as Sam Landon
Brennan Brown as Captain Ward
Nicole Gale Anderson as Heather Chandler
Elisabeth Röhm as Dana Landon
Anthony Ruivivar as Agent Henry Knox
Mark Taylor as Agent Tucker
Annie Ilonzeh as Beth Bowman
Riley Smith as The Bombmaker

Notes

Production

On April 26, 2013, Beauty & the Beast was renewed for a second season of 22 episodes. Filming of Beauty & the Beast was split between New York City, NY and Toronto, Ontario, Canada from the second season.

Casting
Brian White's character, Joe Bishop, was not included in the second season of the series; the storyline was that Bishop lost his job because he focused too much attention on finding the killer of his brother instead of performing his duties. Ted Whittall, having briefly appeared in the final episode of season one where he revealed himself to be Cat's biological father, announced that he would return for season two in the recurring role of Bob Reynolds on July 8, 2013. On September 6, 2013, it was announced that Annie Ilonzeh would be joining the cast of Beauty & the Beast for the show's upcoming second season, playing the role of Beth Bowman, a journalist and an old friend of Catherine Chandler's. On September 10, 2013, it was reported that Amber Skye Noyes had been cast as Tori Windsor, the innocent daughter of a powerful beast who is rescued by Cat and Vincent. On November 12, 2013, Law & Order actress Elisabeth Röhm was cast as Dana Landon, a woman who joins forces with Cat on an investigation into a series of undercover operations. On December 4, 2013, Tom Everett Scott joined the cast of the show, playing the recurring role of Sam Landon, an archaeologist with a short fuse who has been isolated from the outside world for many years.

Episodes

Reception
Shirley Li of Entertainment Weekly gave the second season of Beauty & the Beast'' a score of 42 out of 100, where 0 out of 100 is the lowest possible score and 100 is the highest, on Metacritic. Li commented that the "love story-slash-procedural returns with a Cat and, well, Beast chase that's more dull than thrilling". The great romance and love story left the second season and we're left with another boring crime dreams, the show died because of that change.

U.S. Nielsen ratings

DVD release

References

Season
2013 American television seasons
2014 American television seasons